Can't Touch This is a BBC television game show that aired on BBC One from 26 March to 8 October 2016, hosted by Zoe Ball and Ashley Banjo.

Production 
The series and hosts were announced in September 2015. It was filmed at T13 in the Titanic Quarter in Belfast, Northern Ireland.

References

External links 
 
 

2016 British television series debuts
2016 British television series endings
2010s British game shows
BBC high definition shows
BBC television game shows
English-language television shows
Television series by Sony Pictures Television